The Spain women's national squash team represents Spain in international squash team competitions, and is governed by the Real Federación Española de Squash.

Current team
 Xisela Aranda Núñez
 Cristina Gómez
 Marta Latorre Ramirez
 Marina De Juan Gallach

Results

World Team Squash Championships

References

See also 
 Spanish Squash Federation
 Spain men's national squash team
 World Team Squash Championships

Squash teams
Women's national squash teams
Squash
Squash in Spain